Joonas Sammalmaa (born January 18, 1991) is a Finnish professional ice hockey player. He is currently playing for JYP Jyväskylä of the SM-liiga.

Sammalmaa made his SM-liiga debut playing with JYP Jyväskylä during the 2012–13 SM-liiga season.

References

External links

1991 births
Living people
Finnish ice hockey left wingers
JYP Jyväskylä players
People from Kokkola
Sportspeople from Central Ostrobothnia